Niagara Christian Community of Schools (NCC, formerly known as Niagara Christian Collegiate)  is a private school located on the Niagara River just outside Fort Erie, Ontario, Canada. The school was founded in 1932 by the Brethren in Christ Church, an Anabaptist denomination that emerged out of the Radical Pietistic movement. The site it is now situated on was bought in 1938. The purchase (included  and Belmont Hall) was for $13 000. The school has since grown and now has an enrolment of 270 students from grades 6-12.

Approximately half of NCC students are international students, representing over 15 different countries, including the Brazil, China, Ghana, Hong Kong, Japan, Mexico, Nigeria, Rwanda, Taiwan, Tunisia, UK, and the United States. Sixty percent of the students live in four modern residences on campus.

NCC is an international university prep school focussed on providing students with a world class education, equipping them to live the Christian lifestyle, and empowering them to make a difference in the world.

References

External links
Official website

High schools in the Regional Municipality of Niagara
River Brethren